Kvetun is a rural locality (a village) in Trubchevsky District, Bryansk Oblast, Russia. The population was 469 as of 2010. There are 3 streets.

Geography 
Kvetun is located 11 km southwest of Trubchevsk (the district's administrative centre) by road. Makarzno is the nearest rural locality.

References 

Rural localities in Trubchevsky District